Else Fenger (18 June 1737  27 January 1811) was a Danish businessperson and slave trader.  She managed the soap and slave trading company Borre & Fenger in Copenhagen after the death of her spouse Peter Fenger (d. 1774). She was one of few women in Denmark of her time to manage a major company.

Biography
Else Brock was born on 18 June 1737 in Randers, the daughter of merchant Rasmus Brock (1695-1752) and Marie Kirstine Andersdatter Knudsen (1710–45). She was the younger sister of businessman Niels Brock.

She married Peter Fenger on 17 June 1758 in the Church of Our Saviour in Copenhagen. Her spouse was a major industrialist, but at the time of his death, his partner Peter Borre had retired and Fenger had mismanaged the factory to a point that it was threatened by ruin and the family's palatial home in Copenhagen near public auction. Else Fenger managed to get the company back on its feet and keep the family's luxurious living standard and became a well known and respected business figure. Many anecdotes are told about her.

References

External links
 Else Fenger

1737 births
1811 deaths
18th-century Danish businesspeople
18th-century Danish businesswomen
19th-century Danish businesspeople
19th-century Danish businesswomen
Danish slave traders